The Kyūshū K11W Shiragiku (白菊, "White Chrysanthemum") made by the Kyūshū Aircraft Company, was a land-based bombing trainer aircraft which served in the Imperial Japanese Navy Air Service in the latter years of World War II. As indicated by its Japanese designation, "training aircraft for on-board work" (機上作業練習機, kijō sagyō renshū-ki?), it was designed to train crews in operating equipment for bombing, navigation, and communication, as well as navigation techniques. A total of 798 K11Ws were manufactured, including a small number of K11W2 ASW and transport aircraft alongside the K11W1 trainer variant. These aircraft were also used in kamikaze missions during the last stages of the Pacific War.

Design and development

The Kyūshū K11W had a rather simple mid-wing layout. The crew consisted of a pilot and gunner/radio operator sitting in line under the canopy and the trainee bombardier, trainee navigator, and instructor in the lower fuselage beneath the wing.

The K11W served as the basis for the Q3W1 Nankai (南海, "South Sea") anti-submarine patrol aircraft, which did not progress beyond the development phase. It was enlarged, but unlike the K11W, had retracting landing gear.

Variants

 K11W1 : The basic bomber crew trainer, of all-metal construction with fabric-covered control surfaces.
 K11W2 : Anti-submarine warfare and transport version of all-wood construction.
 Q3W1 Nankai : Dedicated Anti-submarine warfare aircraft based on the K11W. 1 built.

Specifications (K11W1)

See also

References
Notes

Bibliography

  (new edition 1987 by Putnam Aeronautical Books, .)
 Mondey, David. The Concise Guide to Axis Aircraft of World War II. London: Chancellor Press, 1996. .

External links

 K11W at www.combinedfleet.com
 K11W at military.sakura.ne.jp  (Japanese)

World War II Japanese trainer aircraft
1940s Japanese military trainer aircraft
Kyūshū aircraft